"Fearless Love" is a song by Melissa Etheridge and the first single of her 2010 album Fearless Love.

Background
Etheridge wrote the song after her young daughter suggested the title for her album.  Etheridge explained to Spinner the inspiration for the lyric "I was 17, you kissed my lips":   "It was the first time I kissed a girl. I try to put my own experiences in my songs, of course, and yet have them remain universal. It was intense going through that experience and having the fireworks go off: 'Oh my God, this is greatest thing ever! This is what all my girlfriends have been talking about when they kiss boys' and stuff. I was like, 'Hmmm I don't feel that' and then all of a sudden I felt it and I had to keep it in to myself. It will eat you up. It's horrible to have to put a lid on something."

Music video
The video for "Fearless Love" features actress Willa Holland and was directed by Jay Martin.

Charts

Notes

2010 singles
Melissa Etheridge songs
LGBT-related songs
Song recordings produced by John Shanks
Songs written by Melissa Etheridge
2010 songs
Island Records singles